Barfoot is a surname. Notable people with the surname include:

Chris Barfoot (born 1966), film writer, director, and producer
Clyde Barfoot (1891–1971), Major League Baseball player who played 25 years in professional baseball
George Barfoot (born 1812), English cricketer
Joan Barfoot (born 1946), Canadian novelist
Michael Barfoot (born 1980), former English cricketer
Stuart Barfoot (born 1975), English footballer
Van T. Barfoot (1919–2012), United States Army officer, Medal of Honor winner
Walter Barfoot (1893–1978), Canadian Anglican bishop

See also
Barfoot & Thompson, privately owned, non-franchised real estate company based in Auckland, New Zealand